HMAS Anzac (FFH 150) is the lead ship of the Anzac-class frigates in use with the Royal Australian Navy (RAN) and the Royal New Zealand Navy (RNZN). Entering Australian service in 1996, the frigate operated as part of the INTERFET peacekeeping taskforce in 1999. In 2003, she was involved in the Battle of Al Faw, and became the first RAN ship to fire in anger since the Vietnam War. The ship is operational as of 2021.

Design and construction

The Anzac class originated from RAN plans to replace the six s with a mid-capability patrol frigate. The Australian shipbuilding industry was thought to be incapable of warship design, so the RAN decided to take a proven foreign design and modify it. Around the same time, the Royal New Zealand Navy (RNZN) was looking to replace four  frigates; a deterioration in New Zealand-United States relations, the need to improve alliances with nearby nations, and the commonalities between the RAN and RNZN ships' requirements led the two nations to begin collaborating on the acquisition in 1987. Tenders were requested by the Anzac Ship Project at the end of 1986, with 12 ship designs (including an airship) submitted. By August 1987, the tenders were narrowed down in October to Blohm + Voss's MEKO 200 design, the M class (later ) offered by Royal Schelde, and a scaled-down Type 23 frigate proposed by Yarrow Shipbuilders. In 1989, the Australian government announced that Melbourne-based shipbuilder AMECON (which became Tenix Defence) would build the modified MEKO 200 design. The Australians ordered eight ships, while New Zealand ordered two, with an unexercised option for two more.

The Anzacs are based on Blohm + Voss' MEKO 200 PN (or ) frigates, modified to meet Australian and New Zealand specifications and maximise the use of locally built equipment. Each frigate has a  full load displacement. A Combined Diesel or Gas (CODOG) propulsion machinery layout is used, with a single,  General Electric LM2500-30 gas turbine and two  MTU 12V1163 TB83 diesel engines driving the ship's two controllable-pitch propellers. The standard ship's company of an Anzac consists of 22 officers and 141 sailors.

As designed, the main armament for the frigate is a 5-inch 54 calibre Mark 45 gun, supplemented by an eight-cell Mark 41 vertical launch system (for RIM-7 Sea Sparrow or RIM-162 Evolved Sea Sparrow missiles), two  machine guns, and two Mark 32 triple torpedo tube sets (initially firing Mark 46 torpedoes, but later upgraded to use the MU90 Impact torpedo). They were also designed for but not with a close-in weapons system (two Mini Typhoons fitted when required from 2005 onwards), two quad-canister Harpoon anti-ship missile launchers (which were installed across the RAN vessels from 2005 onwards), and a second Mark 41 launcher (which has not been added). The Australian Anzacs use a Sikorsky S-70B-2 Seahawk helicopter; plans to replace them with Kaman SH-2G Super Seasprites were cancelled in 2008 due to ongoing problems.

Anzac was laid down at Williamstown, Victoria on 5 November 1993. The ship was assembled from six hull modules and six superstructure modules, but unlike later ships in the class, which had modules fabricated at three sites, Anzac was built entirely at Williamstown. The frigate was launched on 16 September 1994 by Army nurse Vivian Statham. Anzac was commissioned into the RAN at Station Pier in Melbourne on 18 May 1996. The ship's name is in recognition of the Australian and New Zealand Army Corps (ANZACs) and their service during World War I.

Operational history
In October 1997, the Anzac conducted Operation Dirk supported by HMAS Westralia targeting illegal fishing vessels in the Southern Ocean catching the Patagonian toothfish around Heard Island and McDonald Islands in the Australian Fisheries Zone with the Salvora and the Aliza Glacial apprehended boarded by Clearance divers.

Anzac was deployed to East Timor as part of the Australian-led INTERFET peacekeeping taskforce from 19 to 29 September 1999. The ship was later awarded the battle honour "East Timor 1999" in recognition of this deployment.

Between 2001 and 2003, Anzac was deployed to the Persian Gulf on three occasions.

Anzac was deployed to the Persian Gulf for the third time from February until May 2003, as part of Operation Falconer. On 21 March 2003, Anzac provided naval gunfire support during the Battle of Al Faw. The intent of the assault was to capture the Al Faw Peninsula before Iraqi forces could sabotage the two major oil terminals in the area. The frigate began her first fire support mission at 06:04 on 21 March (the first time a RAN ship had fired in anger in 31 years) and completed seven fire missions over a three-day period. The frigate received the Meritorious Unit Citation on 27 November 2003 for her service during this deployment. In March 2010, Anzac was awarded the battle honours "Persian Gulf 2001–03" and "Iraq 2003".

In 2005, Anzac participated in a Northern Trident deployment: a round-the-world voyage intended as a flag-showing cruise to the northern hemisphere. As part of this deployment, Anzac was involved in ceremonies for the 90th anniversary of the Gallipoli landings, and participated in the fleet review for the bicentenary of the battle of Trafalgar.

On the morning of 13 March 2009, Anzac was one of seventeen warships involved in a ceremonial fleet entry and fleet review in Sydney Harbour, the largest collection of RAN ships since the Australian Bicentenary in 1988. The frigate was one of the thirteen ships involved in the ceremonial entry through Sydney Heads, and anchored in the harbour for the review.

Anzac was assigned to Rotation 29 of Operation Slipper from July 2012 to January 2013 as part of the International Coalition Against Terrorism (ICAT), and which included counter-piracy in the Arabian Sea region and elsewhere.

During 2014, Anzac was the third ship of the class to undergo the Anti-Ship Missile Defence (ASMD) upgrade. The upgrade occurred across 2014 and early 2015, the upgrade included the fitting of CEA Technologies' CEAFAR and CEAMOUNT phased array radars, on new masts, a Vampir NG Infrared Search and Track system, and Sharpeye Navigational Radar Systems, along with improvements to the operations room equipment and layout.

Between March and October 2015, Anzac sailed on a second Northern Trident deployment. The  circumnavigation included port visits to 11 countries and participation in commemorative services for the Gallipoli and Normandy landings.

Anzac has received freedom of entry to the city of Albany, Western Australia: Albany was the port the first convoy of the ANZACs departed Australia from.

Citations

References
Books

Journal articles

News articles

Websites and other sources

External links

Royal Australian Navy webpage for HMAS Anzac

Naval ships of Australia
Anzac-class frigates of the Royal Australian Navy
1994 ships
Recipients of the Meritorious Unit Citation
Fleet Base East